Arjun Sahani is elected unopposed to the Bihar Legislative Council on 3 June 2016. He is currently the Bharatiya Janata Party's state secretary.
Sahani is a former member of the Extremely Backward Caste Commission and head of the Bihar Matsyajeevi Manch. He is a resident of Darbhanga.

References

Living people
Date of birth missing (living people)
Bharatiya Janata Party politicians from Bihar
Members of the Bihar Legislative Council
Place of birth missing (living people)
Year of birth missing (living people)
People from Darbhanga